Kuber Chandra Biswas is a Bangladesh Awami League politician and the former Member of Parliament of Khulna-5.

Career
Biswas started his career as a Judicial Magistrate in then united Bengal in 1944. He retired as District Judge of Barisal in 1966 and started practice as a pleader in the Dacca High Court. He was elected to East Pakistan Assembly in 1970 and simultaneously as Bar Council Deputy Secretary. He was elected to parliament from Khulna-5 as a Bangladesh Awami League candidate in 1973.

References

Awami League politicians
1917 births
1980 deaths
Bangladeshi Hindus
1st Jatiya Sangsad members